Heinrich von Stietencron (18 June 1933 in Ronco sopra Ascona, Switzerland – 12 January 2018) was a German Indologist. He was a Professor and the Director of the Institute of Indology and Comparative Religion at the University of Tübingen.  He was a life member of the Academy of Sciences, Heidelberg and an honorary member of the Société Asiatique, Paris. He was awarded the Padma Shri by the President of India in 2004.

In 2015 he received the "Distinguished Indologist Award" from the Indian government. The award ceremony of this newly created prize was organized in conjunction with the three-day "World Indology Conference" held on November 21, 2015 at New Delhi. President Pranab Mukherjee personally presented the awards function.

Academic career
From 1957 till 1965, Heinrich von Stietencron studied Indology, Old Iranian and Philosophy in Munich and London at the School of Oriental and African Studies. After completing his dissertation in 1966, he was research assistant at the South Asia Institute of the University of Heidelberg. He specialized in Indology after receiving a grant from the German Research Foundation to do fieldwork for a year in India with a thesis on the river goddesses Ganga and Yamuna. From 1970 till 1973 he worked at the Department of Religion and Philosophy of the South Asia Institute at the University of Heidelberg.

From 1973 till 1998 he held the chair of Indology and Comparative Religion at the University of Tübingen.

He has been a visiting professor in 1983-84 in Philadelphia; in 1989 in Rome; and in 1993 in Paris.

Research
From 1970 to 1976, Heinrich von Stietencron worked in a project about the Jagannath cult in Orissa in collaboration with Indian scholars. From 1999 till 2005 a second part of the project, funded by the German Research Foundation, his work focused on sacred centres and religious communities in Orissa.

From 1982 till 1988 and from 1995 till 2000 he worked in a team of scholars on a Puranic and Epic bibliography in two projects, funded by the German Research Foundation.

Selected publications
 Indische Sonnenpriester Sāmba und die Sākadvīpīya-Brāhmaṇa: eine textkritische und religionsgeschichtliche Studie zum indischen Sonnenkult, Wiesbaden: Harrassowitz, 1966.
 Ganga and Yamuna: River Goddesses and their Symbolism in Indian Temples, 1972, .
 Contributor to The Cult of Jagannath and the Regional Tradition of Orissa, Ed by A. Eschmann and G.C. Tripathi, Delhi: Manohar Publications 1978.
 Angst und Religion. Ed. by H. v. Stietencron. Düsseldorf: Patmos Verl., 1991.
 Epic and Purāṇic bibliography (up to 1985); annotated and with indexes, Co-ed.: P. Flamm. Wiesbaden: Harrassowitz, 1992.
 Töten im Krieg. Ed. by H. v. Stietencron. Freiburg: Alber, 1995.
 Representing Hinduism: The Construction of Religious Traditions and National Identity, Co-author: Vasudha Dalmia, Delhi: Sage Publications, 1995.
 Christentum und Weltreligionen - Hinduismus.Co-author: Hans Küng. München: Piper, 1995.
 Der Hinduismus, München: C.H. Beck, 2000 [2010].
 Hindu Myth, Hindu History: Religion, Art, and Politics, Delhi: Permanent Black, 2005, .
 The Oxford India Hinduism Reader, Co-ed.: Vasudha Dalmia, Oxford University Press, Delhi 2007.
 The Divine Play On Earth: Religious Aesthetics And Ritual In Orissa, India, Co-authors: Cornelia Mallebrein, Heidelberg: Synchron 2008.

External links
 The Orissa Research Project
 WebGIS-Interface for the databank "Temples in Orissa", compiled by H. v. Stietencron (work in progress)

1933 births
2018 deaths
Academic staff of the University of Tübingen
German Indologists
Religion academics
20th-century German historians
German male non-fiction writers
Recipients of the Padma Shri in literature & education
21st-century German historians
People from Locarno District